Sliding Rock is a waterfall in Western North Carolina, located near Brevard, so named because visitors can slide all the way down the waterfall into the plunge pool below. Sliding Rock is a small slide-type waterfall on Looking Glass Creek, in the Pisgah National Forest, near Brevard, North Carolina. It has a gentle slope and is about 60 feet long, ending in a large, deep pool (between 6–7 feet deep) at the bottom.

Visiting the Falls

The rock has long been used as a natural water slide for adventurous tourists and locals. The water is very cold and is popular for cooling off in the summer.

The area has been developed by the US Forest Service into a popular recreation area.  Parking is available in a large lot above the rock and beside U.S. Highway 276. There are two viewing platforms, steps down to the pool and railings to help climb the rocks on the left side before sliding down. Sliding down is required in a sitting position only. A restroom and changing room is provided and a lifeguard is periodically on duty especially during summer weekends.  At other times, sliding down the waterfall is done at a visitor's own risk.  Children must be of a certain size to slide alone, otherwise, they may slide in the lap of an adult.

A $5.00 per person fee is charged by the Forest Service to use the area between Memorial Day and Labor Day weekends, when lifeguards and rangers are on duty. The rock is closed to sliders during times of high water or when lightning is detected in the area.

To get to the recreation area and the falls, travel north from the intersection of U.S. Highway 276, approximately 7.7 miles north of the intersection of 276, U.S. Highway 64, and NC Highway 280 in Pisgah Forest, North Carolina.  En route, you will pass Looking Glass Falls and the parking area for Moore Cove Falls.

Nearby Falls
Slick Rock Falls
Moore Cove Falls
Looking Glass Falls
Cedar Rock Falls
Cove Creek Falls
Daniel Ridge Falls
Twin Falls
Log Hollow Falls
Falls on Log Hollow Branch
Key Falls

References

External links
North Carolina Waterfalls - Sliding Rock
Sliding Rock and Other Waterfalls in Transylvania County

Protected areas of Transylvania County, North Carolina
Waterfalls of North Carolina
Pisgah National Forest
Landforms of Transylvania County, North Carolina